Willesley is a village and former civil parish, now in the parish of Ashby-de-la-Zouch, in the North West Leicestershire district, in the county of Leicestershire, England. It was originally in Derbyshire. Willesley Hall was the home of the Abney and later the Abney-Hastings family. In 1931 the parish had a population of 80.

History
Willesley is mentioned as a significant manor in the Domesday book. Willesley is listed among the large number of manors that are owned directly by Henry de Ferrers and its value was assessed as twenty shillings TRE and sixteen shillings in 1086.

There was once a stately home here called Willesley Hall built of red brick.

The village has always been small. The population remained around the figure of 60 from 1805 to 1881.

Little of the manor remains today, although the church and Willesley Lake both remain.

On 1 April 1936 the parish was abolished and merged with Ashby de la Zouch, part also went to Oakthorpe and Donisthorpe and Measham.

Willesley Lake

Willesley Lake is within the 155-acre park of the Former Willesley Hall.  It is a serpentine design and was constructed as a fishing and boating lake and to allow the water level to be controlled for power generation for the Hall.  It is designated as a ‘Site of Ecological Interest’, feeding into the River Mease (a special area of conservation and SSSI).  The 24-acre fishing lake set in 16 acres of woodland provides an excellent fishery today, having a significant stock of fish species.  It is surrounded by beds of snowdrops in February and bluebells in the spring.  The lake attracts a significant number and species of waterfowl and other birds.

The Abney and Hastings family
It was the birthplace of notable people including two called Sir Thomas Abney and Edward Abney whose letters were published recently giving an insight into early 17th century life. One of the Thomas Abney's became a mayor of London whilst another rose to be a judge of common pleas. The Abney family required that owners of the manor should be called Abney. Twice there has had to be a special Act of Parliament for people to add the name Abney to their surname. Sir Charles Abney Hastings, a High Sheriff of Derbyshire was the last person descended from the Abney line. The man who might have inherited the hall, after Sir Charles Abney Hastings died without children, was his younger brother, Frank, a veteran of the Battle of Trafalgar. Unfortunately he died prematurely fighting for the Greeks and was buried in Zante.

Willesley Hall was also used as the name of a steam locomotive in the Hall class by the Great Western Railway.

19th and 20th centuries 
In 1897 the counties of Leicestershire and Derbyshire corrected their boundaries to remove enclaves. Part of Appleby Magna, Chilcote, Measham, Oakthorpe and part of Donisthorpe, Stretton en le Field were transferred to Leicestershire.

The ancient parish of Willesley became a civil parish in 1866, but in 1936 the civil parish was abolished.  Almost all of the parish was absorbed into Ashby de la Zouch.

The golf course in Ashby had existed since the 1920s and at one time considered buying Willesley Hall, but at the time, the lack of members with cars and financial issues, prevented it.

The church
The church of St Thomas dates from the 14th century with a tower added in 1845. The glass is modern heraldic, but with some older glass too. Monuments in the church include one dated 1505 to John and Maria Abney, another to George and Ellen Abney dated 1571 and a Lt. General Sir Charles Hastings' black and white marble tomb who died in 1823.

The parish register started in 1677. In the 19th century the church could seat 100 after its seats and pulpit were replaced in 1883 by the Earl of Loudoun. The Earls of Loudoun inherited the manor of Willesley after the Second Baronet died without children.

The campsite

The hall fell derelict and was bought by Leicestershire Scout district in 1952 along with a small area of land. The hall was demolished and the land became a Scout campsite, however the hall required seven attempts before it gave way to explosives. Further land was later bought by the Scouts, with other areas becoming a fishing lake or adding to the golf facilities.

Willesley Campsite is located one mile (1.6 km) south west of Ashby-de-la-Zouch. It occupies  of the old Willesley Hall estate (part of the original gatehouse is still visible). The camp site has fields, a wood and its own church (St. Thomas's).

Some areas of woodland at Willesley are owned by the Woodland Trust. These areas were surveyed in 2001 for evidence of ancient woodland. The survey showed that there was a continuity of managed woodland cover for at least 200 years, but there was no direct evidence for any continuity of cover since 1600. The site did not therefore qualify as ancient woodland.

Ashby Canal and mining 
Ashby Canal ran along the southern side of the old estate and was used for moving coal and other minerals (limestone) from the area. A large basin was created at the southern edge of the estate alongside the Oakthorpe Colliery from where tramways ran up through Ashby to Ticknall and along the route now of the A42. Mining took place in this area from the 1600s and the lake in the lower part of Willesley wood near Oakthorpe is supposedly due to mining subsidence in the early 1980s. The mining rights to Oakthorpe Colliery see http://www.willesleywood.co.uk will have belonged to the Willesley estate probably until nationalisation in 1946 (confirmation needed). The first record of compensation for mining subsidence is in this area in 1635.

References

Villages in Leicestershire
Former civil parishes in Leicestershire
Ashby-de-la-Zouch